David Fowler (born 1958) is an American politician and a former member of the Tennessee Senate for the 11th district, which comprises part of Hamilton County.

Early life
David Fowler was born on June 30, 1958 in Fort Oglethorpe, Georgia. He grew up in Chattanooga, Tennessee. He graduated from the University of Tennessee at Chattanooga with a B.S. in 1980, and with a J.D. from University of Cincinnati College of Law in 1983.

Career
Fowler practiced the law in Cincinnati, Ohio and Chattanooga, Tennessee. taught Law and Government at Bryan College for four years.

Fowler was a Republican member of the Tennessee State Senate from the 99th Tennessee General Assembly until the 104th, representing Signal Mountain, Tennessee.

Fowler is the president of the Family Action Council of Tennessee (FACT), an organization associated with the Focus on the Family. Upon retiring as state senator in 2006, he donated US$20,000 to FACT. A decade later, in 2016, Fowler staged a rally outside the Tennessee State Capitol in favor of an anti-transgender bathroom bill.

Personal life
Fowler is married, and he has a child. He lives in Nashville, Tennessee.

Controversy 
In 2018 bill banning 'child brides' is scuttled in Tennessee House after Fowler objects.

References

Living people
1958 births
People from Fort Oglethorpe, Georgia
Politicians from Chattanooga, Tennessee
University of Tennessee at Chattanooga alumni
University of Cincinnati College of Law alumni
Republican Party Tennessee state senators
People from Signal Mountain, Tennessee